Sir William Wogan was Custos Rotulorum of Pembrokeshire about 1625.

Year of birth unknown
Year of death unknown
17th-century English people
Political office-holders in England
Place of birth missing